Jacinto Benavente y Martínez (12 August 1866 – 14 July 1954) was one of the foremost Spanish dramatists of the 20th century. He was awarded the Nobel Prize for Literature in 1922 "for the happy manner in which he has continued the illustrious traditions of the Spanish drama".

Biography
Born in Madrid, the son of a celebrated pediatrician, he returned drama to reality by way of social criticism: declamatory verse giving way to prose, melodrama to comedy, formula to experience, impulsive action to dialogue and the play of minds. Benavente showed a preoccupation with aesthetics and later with ethics.

A liberal monarchist and a critic of socialism, he was a reluctant supporter of Francoist Spain as the only viable alternative to what he considered the disastrous republican experiment of 1931–1936. In 1936 Benavente's name became associated with the assassination of the Spanish poet and dramatist Federico García Lorca. This happened when the Nationalist newspapers Estampa, El Correo de Andalucia, and Ideal circulated a fake news story that Lorca had been killed as a reprisal for the Republican murder of Benavente. Benavente died in Aldeaencabo de Escalona (Toledo) at the age of 87. He never married. According to many sources, he was homosexual.

Principal works

Jacinto Benavente wrote 172 works. Among his most important works are:
 El nido ajeno (Another's Nest, 1894), comedy, three acts.
 Gente conocida (High Society, 1896), satirical scenes of modern life, four acts.
 La Gobernadora (The Governor's Wife, 1901), comedy, three acts.
 La noche del sábado (Saturday Night, 1903), stage romance, five divisions; Imperia is a ballerina and later prostitute who falls in love with Prince Miguel, who will take the throne of Swabia.
 Rosas de otoño (Autumnal Roses, 1905), sentimental comedy, three acts.
 Los intereses creados (The Bonds of Interest, 1907), comedy of masks based on the Italian commedia dell'arte; Benavente's most famous and often performed work.
 Señora ama (The Lady of the House, 1908), rural drama; a penetrating psychological study of a woman jealous of her husband.
 El príncipe que todo lo aprendió en los libros (1909)
 The Unloved Woman (La malquerida), 1913), rural psychological drama, three acts; the basis for the 1921 film The Passion Flower, starring Norma Talmadge.
 La ciudad alegre y confiada (1916), continuation from Los intereses creados.
 Campo de armiño (1916)
 Lecciones de buen amor (1924)
 La mariposa que voló sobre el mar (1926)
 Pepa Doncel (1928)
 Vidas cruzadas (1929)
 Aves y pájaros (1940)
 La honradez de la cerradura (1942)
 La infanzona (1945)
 Titania (1946)
 La infanzona (1947)
 Abdicación (1948)
 Ha llegado Don Juan (1952)
 El alfiler en la boca (1954)
 Hijos, padres de sus padres (Sons, Fathers of Their Parents, 1954)

References

External links

 
 
 Works by Jacinto Benavente
 List of Works
 
  
 Biography and bibliography at Noble-Winners.com (unofficial) website
 Brief article in the Columbia Encyclopedia Online
 Encyclopedia of World Biography article, reproduced at BookRags.com
 

1866 births
1954 deaths
Writers from Madrid
Spanish gay writers
Nobel laureates in Literature
Members of the Royal Spanish Academy
Spanish LGBT dramatists and playwrights
Spanish male dramatists and playwrights
Spanish Nobel laureates
Spanish monarchists
Gay dramatists and playwrights
Complutense University of Madrid alumni
Spanish people of the Spanish Civil War (National faction)
LGBT Nobel laureates
LGBT history in Spain